Greenleigh is an acreage estate to the east of the City of Queanbeyan in New South Wales, Australia. It was formerly known as Dodsworth.

Greenleigh has the highest house prices and rates in Queanbeyan.

References

Queanbeyan